Madge Brindley (15 October 1901 – 28 August 1968) was a British repertory and film actress.

Life
She was born, Doreen Ilse Johnson  in Bedford Park, London, England. She was an actress, known in later life for her character parts, usually as loud and aggressive matronly women. She began her acting career in 1925 with the Birmingham Repertory Company in the play The Farmers Wife. She is best known for her film parts in The Spider and the Fly (1949), Alice in Wonderland (1946) and Hobson's Choice (1954), The Ladykillers (1955), A Kid for Two Farthings (1955) and for her role in Quatermass and the Pit (1958). She died on 28 August 1968 in Brighton, East Sussex, England in a road accident aged 66.

Filmography

References
 Aveleyman - Madge Brindley

British actresses
1901 births
1968 deaths